Xbox is a video gaming brand created and owned by Microsoft. The brand consists of five video game consoles, as well as applications (games), streaming services, an online service by the name of Xbox network, and the development arm by the name of Xbox Game Studios. The brand was first introduced in the United States in November 2001, with the launch of the original Xbox console.

The original device was the first video game console offered by an American company after the Atari Jaguar stopped sales in 1996. It reached over 24 million units sold by May 2006. Microsoft's second console, the Xbox 360, was released in 2005 and has sold 86 million units as of October 2021. The third console, the Xbox One, was released in November 2013 and has sold 51 million units. The fourth line of Xbox consoles, the Xbox Series X and Series S, were released in November 2020. The head of Xbox is Phil Spencer, who succeeded former head Marc Whitten in late March 2014.

History 
When Sony Computer Entertainment first announced the PlayStation 2 in 1999, the company had positioned the console as a centerpiece for home entertainment, as it not only would play video games, but also could play audio CDs and video DVDs. Microsoft, whose business had been primarily in supporting the personal computer (PC) business with its Windows operating system, software, and games, saw the PlayStation 2 as a threat to the personal computer.

Four engineers from Microsoft's DirectX team—Kevin Bachus, Seamus Blackley, Ted Hase and DirectX team leader Otto Berkes, began to envision what a Microsoft console to compete against the PlayStation 2 would be like. They designed a system that would use many hardware components in common with PCs, effectively running a version of Windows and DirectX to power the games on the console. This approach would make it easy for developers on Windows to build games for their new system, differentiating itself from the custom hardware solutions of most consoles. Numerous names were suggested for this console, including "Direct X Box", and the "Windows Entertainment Project". Microsoft's marketing team conducted consumer surveys of the name, using the name "Xbox" as a control believing this would be least desirable, but found that this had the highest preference from their tests, and was selected as the name of the console.

While the original Xbox had modest sales, Microsoft took a large financial loss to support it. However, its performance was sufficient to convince the company to continue to produce the line. Since its release, there have been four generations of Xbox, with the most recent being the Xbox Series X and Series S units. The Xbox has become a direct competitor to Sony's PlayStation brand, both offering high performance gaming systems at roughly similar specifications.

Future 
Microsoft has been recently working to leverage the branding of "Xbox" beyond the console hardware but as a general video game brand, reflected in the renaming of Microsoft Studios to Xbox Game Studios in 2019. Phil Spencer stated in June 2019 that for Microsoft, "The business isn't how many consoles you sell. The business is how many players are playing the games that they buy, how they play." which journalists have taken as a route to de-emphasize console hardware and prioritize games, subscriptions and services for players. Later in February 2020, Spencer said that moving forward, the company does not see "traditional gaming companies" like Nintendo and Sony as their competitors but instead those that offer cloud computing services such as Amazon and Google. Spencer identified that Microsoft Azure is a major component of their plans going forward, which powers its xCloud game streaming service. Spencer also cited mobile gaming as a potential area, and where Microsoft was trying to position itself with its services should this become the more preferred form for gaming. Spencer said "I don't think it's "hardware agnostic" as much as it's 'where you want to play'", in describing how Microsoft was strategizing the Xbox branding for the future.

Consoles

First generation: Xbox 

The original Xbox was released on November 15, 2001, in North America, February 22, 2002, in Japan, and March 14, 2002, in Australia and Europe. It was Microsoft's first foray into the gaming console market. As part of the sixth generation of video game consoles, the Xbox competed with Sony's PlayStation 2, Sega's Dreamcast (which stopped American sales before the Xbox went on sale), and Nintendo's GameCube. The Xbox was the first console offered by an American company after the Atari Jaguar stopped sales in 1996. The name Xbox was derived from a contraction of DirectX Box, a reference to Microsoft's graphics API, DirectX.

The integrated Xbox Live service launched in November 2002 allowed players to play games online with a broadband connection. It first competed with Dreamcast's online service but later primarily competed with PlayStation 2's online service. Although the two competing services were free, while Xbox Live required a subscription - as well as broadband-only connection, which was not completely adopted yet - Xbox Live was a success due to it having better servers, features such as a buddy list, and milestone titles such as Halo 2 (released in November 2004), which became the best-selling Xbox video game and was by far the most popular online game for the original Xbox system.

Second generation: Xbox 360 

The Xbox 360 was released as the successor of the original Xbox in November 2005, competing with Sony's PlayStation 3 and Nintendo's Wii as part of the seventh generation of video game consoles. As of June 2014, 84 million Xbox 360 consoles have been sold worldwide. The Xbox 360 was officially unveiled on MTV on May 12, 2005, with detailed launch and game information divulged later that month at the Electronic Entertainment Expo (E3). The console sold out completely upon release in all regions except in Japan. Several retail configurations of the core Xbox 360 model were offered over its lifetime, varying the amount of RAM and internal storage offered.

The Xbox 360 showed an expanded Xbox Live service (which now included a limited "Free" tier called Silver), the ability to stream multimedia content from PCs, while later updates added the ability to purchase and stream music, television programs, and films through the Xbox Music and Xbox Video services, along with access to third-party content services through third-party media streaming applications. Microsoft also released Kinect, a motion control system for the Xbox 360 which uses an advanced sensor system.

Two major revisions of the Xbox 360 were released following the initial launch. The Xbox 360 S (typically considered as "Slim"), launched in 2010, featured the same core hardware but with a redesigned, slimmer form factor with a smaller-sized 250 GB hard drive. It also added integrated 802.11 b/g/n Wi-Fi, TOSLINK S/PDIF optical audio output, five USB 2.0 ports (compared to the three from older versions) and a special port designed for the Kinect peripheral. The Xbox 360 S replaced the base Xbox 360 unit, which was discontinued, and sold at the same price. A cheaper Xbox 360 S unit, removing the 250 GB drive while adding 4 GB of internal storage, was released later in 2010; the unit allowed users to hook up an external storage solution or purchase a 250 GB internal add-on.

The second major revision of the Xbox 360 was the Xbox 360 E, released in 2013. It featured a case style similar to the upcoming Xbox One, and eliminated one USB port and the S/PDIF, YPbPr component and S-video connections, but otherwise shared the same specifications as the Xbox 360 S.

Third generation: Xbox One 

The Xbox One was released on November 22, 2013, in North America, as the successor to the Xbox 360. The Xbox One competes with Sony's PlayStation 4 and Nintendo's Wii U and Switch as part of the eighth generation of video game consoles.

Announced on May 21, 2013, the Xbox One has an emphasis on internet-based features, including the ability to record and stream gameplay, and the ability to integrate with a set-top box to watch cable or satellite TV through the console with an enhanced guide interface and Kinect-based voice control.

Following its unveiling, the Xbox One proved controversial for its original digital rights management and privacy practices; while Microsoft touted the ability for users to access their library of games (regardless of whether they were purchased physically or digitally) on any Xbox One console without needing their discs, and the ability to share their entire library with 10 designated "family" members, all games would have to be tied to the user's Xbox Live account and their Xbox One console, and the console would be required to connect to the Internet on a periodic basis (at least once every 24 hours) to synchronize the library, or else the console would be unable to play any games at all. After an overwhelmingly negative response from critics and consumers (who also showed concerns that the system could prevent or hinder the resale of used games), Microsoft announced that these restrictions would be dropped. Microsoft was also criticized for requiring the Xbox One to have its updated Kinect peripheral plugged in to function, which critics and privacy advocates believed could be used as a surveillance device. As a gesture toward showing a commitment to user privacy, Microsoft decided to allow the console to function without Kinect.

On June 13, 2016, Microsoft announced the Xbox One S at E3 2016, which featured a smaller form factor, as well as support for 4K video (including streaming and Ultra HD Blu-ray) and HDR. At E3 2017, Microsoft unveiled Xbox One X, a high-end model with improved hardware designed to facilitate the playing of games at 4K resolution.

Since November 2014, Microsoft has stated it will not release sales numbers for the Xbox One line. Industry estimates project global sales of the Xbox One family to be about 51 million units. Xbox head Phil Spencer said that while they do internally track sales figures, they do not want their developers to be focused on these numbers as to affect their products, and thus have opted not to report further sales of Xbox hardware going forward.

Fourth generation: Xbox Series X and Series S 

The fourth generation of Xbox models, simply named Xbox, includes the Xbox Series X and Xbox Series S that launched on November 10, 2020. Both are considered members of the ninth generation of video game consoles alongside the PlayStation 5, also released that month.

The Xbox Series X and Series S are high- and low-end versions comparable to the Xbox One X and Xbox One S models, respectively, with all games designed for this model family playable on both systems. The Xbox Series X is estimated to be four times as powerful as Xbox One X, with support for 8K resolution and up to 120 frames-per-second rendering, with a nominal target of 4K resolution at 60 frames per second. The Xbox Series S is a digital-only unit with less graphic processing power, but can still render at a nominal 1440p resolution at 60 frames per second with support for 4K upscaling. Both consoles features support for new graphics rendering systems including  real-time ray-tracing, and the new Xbox Velocity Architecture that works with the internal SSD drive to maximize the rate of texture streaming to the graphics processor, among other features. Besides games for this new console family, both consoles are fully compatible with all Xbox One games and most hardware, as well as all backward compatible games that were playable on the Xbox One from the Xbox 360 and original Xbox console.

To help transition consumers, Microsoft introduced its Smart Delivery system which most of its first-party games and several third-party games will use to offer free updates to Xbox One versions of games to the Xbox Series X/S version over the first few years of the consoles' launch.

Comparison 
The following table is a comparison of the four generations of Xbox hardware.

Games 

Each console has a variety of games. Most games released on the original Xbox are backwards compatible and can be played directly on its successor, Xbox 360. Backward compatibility with Xbox 360 titles was added to Xbox One in June 2015, although titles requiring Kinect or USB peripherals will not be supported.

Games using the Xbox and Xbox Live brands have also been released for Microsoft Windows, Windows Phone, Android, and iOS devices. Xbox games can also be played using the Xbox Cloud Gaming streaming service.

Services 
Microsoft has used the razor and blades model to sell the family of Xbox consoles, selling the console at or below the price of its manufacturing costs, while earning revenue from licensing fees it collects from publishers and developers and from its services offered to players.

Xbox network 

Xbox network (formerly known as Xbox Live) is an online service with over 65 million users worldwide (as of July 2019). It comprises an online virtual market, the Xbox Games Store, which allows the purchase and download of games and various forms of multimedia. Online gaming on the Xbox first started on November 15, 2002, worldwide. The service is still active and continues to be played by gamers.

Xbox Games Store 

Xbox Games Store is an online marketplace made for Microsoft's Xbox One and Xbox Series X|S consoles. The marketplace is where you can buy games and movies through digital download.

Xbox SmartGlass 

Xbox SmartGlass is a companion application for Xbox 360 available for Windows 8, Windows 10, Windows Phone, iOS, Android (version 4.0 and above), and Windows Server 2012. It was announced by Microsoft during E3 2012 and released on October 26, 2012, coinciding with the release of Windows 8. It connects with the Xbox 360 and allows more interactive entertainment, allowing mobile devices to potentially serve as second screens and remote controller. Currently Windows 8 and Windows RT Tablets and PCs, Windows Phone (7.5 and 8) iOS devices, and Android smartphones (4.x) are compatible with SmartGlass, providing information such as Halo 4 stats and Forza Horizon GPS. Users of Windows Server 2012 can currently download the application from the Windows Store after installing the Windows Desktop Experience feature in the Server Manager.

Xbox Game Pass Cloud Gaming 

Xbox Game Pass Cloud Gaming (codenamed xCloud during development) is the Microsoft's Xbox cloud gaming streaming service.

Content filter 
In 2019, Microsoft released a content filtering to stop swearing and toxicity in online gaming. The service enables players to report messages, Gamertags, photos, and any other toxic content on its platform.

Xbox Game Pass 

Xbox Game Pass is a subscription service from Microsoft for use with its Xbox One and Windows 10. The Xbox Game Pass grants users access to a catalog of games from a range of publishers for a single monthly subscription price. The service was launched on June 1, 2017.

Xbox Wire 
Xbox Wire is Xbox's news blog, launched by Microsoft in May 2013 in preparation for the announcement of the Xbox One. It was Microsoft's first Xbox-focused blog since it shut down Gamerscore in early 2009. In March 2022, a Japanese-language version of the site was published as part of Microsoft's focus on the Japanese gaming market.

Software 

The main interface for all four generations of Xbox has been the Xbox Dashboard, which allows users to manage games stored on the console, play media, and access system settings. Since 2002, the Dashboard has been integrated with Xbox Live that provides online functionality and storefront options. Though the software for the original Xbox and the Xbox 360 was originally built on a heavily modified Windows 2000 operating system, the software since the Xbox One has used a Windows-based system (first Windows 8, now Windows 10) that allows for easy of compatibility between the console and desktop applications.

Xbox Family Settings App 
In May 2020, Xbox presented a preview version of an app that allows parents and guardians to set daily limits for their children's playing time, provides weekly activity reports, filters out age-restricted games, and places limits on online communication. This is the attempt of Microsoft, Xbox's owner, to promote a message of responsible gaming. The full release is expected in the end of 2020 or later.

Controllers

Xbox controller 

Released in 2001, the Xbox control pad was the first controller made for the original Xbox. The Xbox controller features two analog sticks, a pressure-sensitive directional pad, two analog triggers, a Back button, a Start button, two accessory slots and six 8-bit analog action buttons (A/Green, B/Red, X/Blue, Y/Yellow, and Black and White buttons). The original Xbox controller (nicknamed the "Fatty" and later the "Duke") was the controller initially bundled with Xbox systems for all territories except Japan, which received a more compact controller called the Controller S. The Controller S was later made the standard included controller in all territories.

Xbox 360 controller 

Released in 2005, the Xbox 360 controller for the Xbox 360 succeeded its predecessor. A standard Xbox 360 controller features eleven digital buttons, two analog triggers, two analog sticks and a digital D-pad. The right face of the controller features four digital action buttons; a green "A" button, red "B" button, blue "X" button and yellow "Y" button. The lower right houses the right analog stick, in the lower left is a digital D-pad and on the left face is the left analog stick. Both analog sticks can also be "clicked in" to activate a digital button beneath. In the center of the controller face are digital "Start", "Back" and "Guide" buttons. The "Guide" button is labelled with the Xbox logo, and is used to turn on the console/controller and to access the guide menu. It is also surrounded by the "ring of light", which indicates the controller number, as well as flashing when connecting and to provide notifications. The left and right "shoulders" each feature a digital shoulder button, or "bumper", and an analog trigger.

Xbox One controller 

The Xbox One console has a revised controller with forty improvements over the 360's controller. This new controller is built to work with Kinect. The Start and Back buttons are replaced with Menu and View buttons. It has impulse triggers that replace the regular triggers. The Xbox button still brings up the mini-guide as of recent dashboard versions, though in earlier iterations it brought up the main dashboard menu while leaving the game uninterrupted.

Xbox Series X and Series S Controller 
The fourth generation Xbox Controller doesn't change much from the Xbox One controller, but the new wireless Xbox Controller does add a capture and share button, a hybrid d-pad, and better gripping on the bumpers and triggers. The controller is also promised to be cross compatible with certain PC's and mobile devices.

Xbox Adaptive Controller

The Xbox Adaptive Controller is a special controller designed for accessibility features for players. Besides being physically larger than typical controllers, it includes additional ports to allow other devices to be connected and mapped to other controller functions. The controller is not limited to just Xbox and Windows platforms but also is compatible with the PlayStation and Nintendo Switch.

Other accessories

Kinect 

Kinect (stylized as KINECT) is a motion sensing input device by Microsoft for the Xbox 360 video game console and Windows PCs. Based around a webcam-style add-on peripheral for the Xbox 360 console, it enables users to control and interact with the Xbox 360 without the need to touch a game controller, through a natural user interface using gestures and spoken commands. The project is aimed at broadening the Xbox 360's audience beyond its typical gamer base. Kinect competes with the Wii Remote Plus and PlayStation Move with PlayStation Eye motion controllers for the Wii and PlayStation 3 home consoles, respectively. A version for Windows was released on February 1, 2012.

Kinect was launched in North America on November 4, 2010, in Europe on November 10, 2010, in Australia, New Zealand and Singapore on November 18, 2010, and in Japan on November 20, 2010. Purchase options for the sensor peripheral include a bundle with the game Kinect Adventures and console bundles with either a 4 GB or 250 GB Xbox 360 console and Kinect Adventures.

The Kinect claimed the Guinness World Record of being the "fastest selling consumer electronics device" after selling a total of 8 million units in its first 60 days. 24 million units of the Kinect sensor had been shipped as of January 2012.

Microsoft released Kinect software development kit for Windows 7 on June 16, 2011. This SDK was meant to allow developers to write Kinecting apps in C++/CLI, C#, or Visual Basic .NET.

Additional information on the Xbox One Kinect was released on June 6, 2013, including information on how to turn off the "always on" feature.

Although featuring improved performance over the original Xbox 360 Kinect, its successor the Xbox One Kinect was subject to mixed responses. It was praised for its wide-angle, its fast response time and high-quality camera. However, the Kinect's inability to understand some accents in English was criticized. Furthermore, controversies surround Microsoft's intentional tying of the sensor with the Xbox One console despite the initial requirements for the sensor being plugged in at all times having been revised since its initial announcement. There have also been a number of concerns regarding privacy.

Headsets
When the Xbox Live online service was launched in 2002, the Xbox Communicator headset was included with the Live Starter Kit. The Communicator, which enabled in-game voice chat, consisted of a wired headset and an interface module. The module plugged into the controller's top expansion slot, and the headset plugged into the module; the interface module was equipped with a dial to control volume and a button to mute the microphone. The headset socket on the module was a standard 2.5mm TRS audio jack with monaural input and output, compatible with cellular phone headsets.

Xbox 360 controllers featured a built-in monaural 2.5mm TRS jack also compatible with standard cellular phone headsets, allowing players to reuse the Xbox Communicator headset and chat on Xbox Live without a separate interface module. The premium console bundle included a wired Xbox 360 Live Communicator headset with grey and white cosmetics matching the console, which also was available separately; the wired headset connected to the audio jack on the bottom of the controller through a wide plug that included mute and volume controls. An updated Xbox 360 Headset was released in 2010 with black cosmetics, bundled with the Xbox 360 S; for the revised wired headset, the mute/volume controls were moved to a position inline along the cable.

Microsoft also announced the Xbox 360 Wireless Headset, a first-party single-ear headset accessory designed for and released with the Xbox 360 console in November 2005. Special editions of the wireless headset were released with colors themed for Halo 3 (green/orange, September 2007), the Xbox 360 S (black, 2010), and Halo: Reach (silver, September 2010). It was replaced by the Xbox 360 Wireless Headset with Bluetooth in 2011, which could be used with the console (using the Xbox wireless protocol) or a phone (using Bluetooth).

The initial revision of the Xbox One Wireless Controller (Model 1537) also included a 2.5mm monaural jack compatible with standard cellular phone headsets. Microsoft bundled the Xbox One Chat Headset with each console starting from launch in 2013; the headset was permanently wired to an interface module that plugged into the controller's expansion port and provided microphone mute and volume controls. In addition, Microsoft released the Xbox One Stereo Headset in early March 2014, bundled with a Stereo Headset Adapter, which allowed players to listen to in-game audio blended with chat simultaneously. The Adapter connected to the controller's expansion port and headset jack, and the Headset connected to the Adapter through a 3.5mm plug. Prior headsets released with the Xbox and Xbox 360 were limited to voice chat only. A white-colored special edition was released in fall 2016. The next revision of the controller (Model 1697) replaced with 2.5mm jack with a 3.5mm jack.

A new Xbox Wireless Headset was introduced in February 2021, targeted for use on the Xbox One, Xbox Series X/S, and Windows computers. The outer surface of each earcup is a rotary control; the right earcup controls overall volume, and the left earcup controls game/chat mix level. It is equipped with both proprietary Xbox Wireless and Bluetooth radios, and could be connected to both simultaneously. A corresponding Xbox Stereo Headset, which omits the wireless connections in favor of a standard 3.5mm plug and also omits the game/chat mix control dial, was introduced in August 2021 with a reduced price.

Marketing 

In 2016, Microsoft announced that it would hold its own Xbox FanFest instead of a press conference at the Gamescom annual European video game convention. Microsoft held an Xbox FanFest in Sydney in September 2016.

Microsoft held a 20th anniversary celebration stream for the Xbox on November 15, 2021. During it, they announced that a documentary behind the history of the Xbox, titled Power On: The Story of Xbox. The documentary was released in six parts starting on December 13, 2021. The documentary won the Daytime Emmy Award for Outstanding Single Camera Editing.

Notes

References

External links 

 

 
2000s in video gaming
2000s toys
2001 in video gaming
2010s in video gaming
2010s toys
Computer-related introductions in 2001
Eighth-generation video game consoles
Home video game consoles
Microsoft franchises
Microsoft video game consoles
Products introduced in 2001
Seventh-generation video game consoles
Sixth-generation video game consoles